This article lists the presidents of the Federal Assembly of the Socialist Federal Republic of Yugoslavia.

List

See also 

 Parliament of Yugoslavia
 List of presidents of the Federal Chamber of the Federal Assembly of Yugoslavia
 List of presidents of the Chamber of Republics and Provinces of the Federal Assembly of Yugoslavia
 List of presidents of the Chamber of Nationalities of the Federal Assembly of Yugoslavia
 List of presidents of the Economic Chamber of the Federal Assembly of Yugoslavia
 List of presidents of the Chamber of Education and Culture of the Federal Assembly of Yugoslavia
 List of presidents of the Chamber of Health and Social Welfare of the Federal Assembly of Yugoslavia
 List of presidents of the Socio-Political Chamber of the Federal Assembly of Yugoslavia
 Parliament of Serbia and Montenegro
 List of presidents of the Chamber of Citizens of the Federal Assembly of Yugoslavia
 List of presidents of the Chamber of Republics of the Federal Assembly of Yugoslavia
 List of presidents of the Assembly of Serbia and Montenegro
 List of presidents of the People's Assembly of Bosnia and Herzegovina
 Speaker of the Croatian Parliament
 President of the Parliament of Montenegro
 List of presidents of the Assembly of the Republic of North Macedonia
 President of the National Assembly of Serbia
 List of speakers of the National Assembly of Slovenia
 President of the Assembly of Vojvodina
 List of presidents of the Assembly of Kosovo
 Chairman of the Assembly of Kosovo

Notes

Sources 
Yugoslav ministries, etc – Rulers.org

Politics of Yugoslavia
Presidents of the Federal Assembly
Yugoslavia, Federal Assembly